Barangay elections were held for the first time in the country's 42,000 barangays for the positions of barangay captains and six councilors on May 17, 1982 following the Batas Pambansa Blg. 222 or the Barangay Election Act of 1982.

Barangay officials 
A barangay is led and governed by its barangay officials. The barangay officials are considered as a Local Government Unit (LGU) same as the Provincial and the Municipal Government.  It is composed of a Punong Barangay, seven Barangay Councils or Barangay Kagawad.  Thus, there are eight members of the Legislative Council in a barangay. Each member has its own respective committee where they are Chairmen of those committees. There are three appointed members of each committee.

The Committees are the following:
 Peace and Order Committee
 Infrastructure Committee
 Education Committee
 Health Committee
 Agriculture Committee
 Tourism Committee
 Finance Committee
 Youth and Sports Committee

See also 
 Commission on Elections
 Politics of the Philippines
 Philippine elections
 President of the Philippines

References

External links 
 The Philippine Presidency Project
 Official website of the Commission on Elections

1982
1982 elections in the Philippines